Valentines is a town of central Uruguay, divided in two parts belonging to Florida Department and Treinta y Tres Department respectively.

Overview
Valentines is located on the Cuchilla Grande, 3 km from Route 7 (km 234) and near the crossing with Route 19.

Historically this place has been known for the presence of iron ore in the form of valentinesite.

A wind farm is being built nearby.

References

Populated places in the Treinta y Tres Department
Populated places in the Florida Department